Abravan (also Romanized as Ābravān; also known as Adowar and Qahveh Khāneh-ye Ābravān) is a village in Abravan Rural District, Razaviyeh District, Mashhad County, Razavi Khorasan Province, Iran. At the 2006 census, its population was 989, in 246 families.

See also 

 List of cities, towns and villages in Razavi Khorasan Province

References 

Populated places in Mashhad County